Kyrie is a unisex given name. Notable people with the name include:

 Kyrie Irving (born 1992), American basketball player
 Kyrie Kristmanson (born 1989 or 1990), Canadian singer, songwriter, and musician
 Kyrie O'Connor (born 1954), American writer and newspaper editor
 Kyrie Wilson (born 1992), American gridiron football player

Fictional characters
 Kyrie, the female lead in the video game Devil May Cry 4
Kyrie Canaan, a female character in the video game Final Fantasy VII Remake and the novel Final Fantasy VII The Kids Are Alright: A Turks Side Story
Kyrie Florian, a female main character in the game Mahou Shoujo Lyrical Nanoha A's Portable: The Gears of Destiny
 Kyrie Illunis, male protagonist of the Nintendo DS video game Sands of Destruction
Kyrie Ushiromiya, a female supporting character in the visual novel, manga, and anime series Umineko no Naku Koro ni

See also

Kyree, given name
Karie (name)

English-language unisex given names